Turnip yellow mosaic virus (TYMV) is an isometric Tymovirus of the family Tymoviridae. Its host range is confined almost entirely to plants in the genus Brassica in western Europe, which includes cabbages, cauliflower and broccoli. Infection causes bright yellow mosaic disease showing vein clearing and molting of plant tissues.

Transmission
It is transmitted by sap as well as a host of insect vectors. The most prominent of these are in the Phyllotreta and Psylliodes genera of flea beetles, although Phaedon cochleariae and its larva have also been known to help spread this virus. The larva lose their ability to transmit the disease once they reach the pupal stage, suggesting a mechanical infection process.

References

External links

 ICTVb Description
 Plant Viruses Online –  Turnip yellow mosaic tymovirus

Tymoviridae
Viral plant pathogens and diseases